"Up" is a song by American rapper Cardi B. It was released on February 5, 2021, through Atlantic Records as the second single from her upcoming second studio album. "Up" is a hip hop song with drill influences, written by Cardi B alongside Joshua Baker and Jordan Thorpe and produced by Yung Dza, DJ SwanQo, Sean Island and DJ Prince.

"Up" reached number one on the US Billboard Hot 100, making Cardi B the only female rapper to top the chart with multiple solo singles, following her first "Bodak Yellow". It previously debuted at number two on the chart, which at the time marked the highest debut for a solo female rap song since Lauryn Hill's "Doo Wop (That Thing)" in 1998, and became her second number-one debut on the Rolling Stone Top 100. It also reached the top ten in Canada, Greece, and Ireland, and became her second top five debut on the Billboard Global 200. 

"Up" received a nomination for the Grammy Award for Best Rap Performance at the 2022 Grammys, extending Cardi B's record as the female rapper with the most nominations in that category. It won the American Music Award for Favorite Rap/Hip Hop Song, making Cardi B the first artist to win the category three times. The music video received nominations for the BET Award for Video of the Year and the American Music Award for Video of the Year. She performed the song at the 63rd Annual Grammy Awards on March 14, 2021.

Background
On August 7, 2020, Cardi B released the single "WAP", featuring American rapper Megan Thee Stallion. The song achieved worldwide success, reaching number one in multiple countries, including Australia, Canada and the UK. The single also spent a total of four weeks atop the Billboard Hot 100. On October 1, 2020, it was revealed that she was already "plotting her next move". However, she also clarified that she does not desire to put out music too frequently in order not to succumb to the label's pressure, saying "I feel like I'm not gonna let that shit get to me to the point that I'm gonna put out a song that I'm not really in love with just 'cause". On January 31, 2021, the rapper teased towards an announcement she was going to make the day after. She revealed the song title alongside the cover art the following day, February 1. The song was released on February 5. In an interview with Apple Music's Zane Lowe, the rapper stated that "Up" is inspired by Chicago drill music, which also influenced her first mixtape Gangsta Bitch Music, Vol. 1. "If it's up then it's stuck" is colloquialism for "street beef." In 2022, Cardi B confirmed that "Up" would appear on her upcoming second studio album. When asked about the meaning of the song on Late Night with Jimmy Fallon, she responded, "Um, so, have you ever taken a poop right? And it don't come out? It's just up and it's stuck".

Critical reception
In Pitchfork, Cat Zhang stated that "Up" has "Cardi's characteristic self-assurance and instantly quotable one-liners", praising it as "a solid showing." Zhang also added that Cardi B "is skilled at these types of brusque taunts" as "her taut delivery drives the song." Lindsay Zoladz of The New York Times declared that Cardi B's "preferred method of annihilating the haters is oxygen deprivation" considering that "her flow is so relentless that for nearly three minutes she doesn't offer listeners a single moment to catch their breath." Zoladz also wrote that Cardi B "raps with rapturous alliteration, before running that tongue twister back again, in case you didn't catch it all the first time," and commented that her tone is a bit more cheerful "than the drill influence would suggest", featuring "some classically comedic Cardi punch lines, but the ravenous way she digs into this beat is serious business." Kyann-Sian Williams of NME opined that "Cardi's lyricism stands up many of her peers" while "proving that she still has plenty of fresh bars," further adding that the rapper "created a new power anthem with this one." Ben Beaumont-Thomas of The Guardian wrote that "Cardi B deserves the crown", and called the song "a blast of pure entertainment" that "flaires out her favoured consonant in a spittle-drenching, supremely satisfying tongue twister", while speaking on the Grammy nomination.

Accolades

Commercial performance
In the United States, "Up" debuted at number two on the Billboard Hot 100 chart, marking the highest debut for a solo female rap song since Lauryn Hill's "Doo Wop (That Thing)" in 1998, record later surpassed by Nicki Minaj's Super Freaky Girl. It became Cardi B's ninth top-ten single on the Hot 100, and opened atop both Digital Song Sales and Streaming Songs charts, where it marked Cardi B's fifth and fourth leader, respectively. The single also started at number one on both the Hot R&B/Hip-Hop Songs and Hot Rap Songs charts, which use the same methodology as the Hot 100, with Cardi B achieving her sixth and fifth leader, respectively. Cardi B has achieved at least one top 10 in each of the last five years, dating to her first number one single "Bodak Yellow" in 2017. Before reaching the summit, it spent four weeks in the top five, including three at number two. The week after her Grammy Awards performance, "Up" reached number one on the Hot 100 rising six spots to number one, causing Cardi B to become the sole female rapper to top the chart several times with solo songs, after "Bodak Yellow", and furthered her record as the female rap artist with the most number-one hits on the Hot 100 as her fifth song to top the chart. "Up" received 22.7 million U.S. streams and 18,000 digital song sales in the week ending March 18, according to MRC Data. It also attracted 34.9 million radio airplay audience impressions (up 7%) in that week. Dating to her first week atop the Hot 100 with "Bodak Yellow" in 2017, Cardi B ties for the second most number-one hits among all acts with Ariana Grande, Drake leads with six.

Cardi B also tied Taylor Swift for the most number ones on the US Streaming Songs chart among women, with four each. She joined a three-way tie for the third most number-ones among all artists, Justin Bieber is second with five and Drake leading with ten. "Up" debuted at number one on the Rolling Stone Top 100, becoming both Cardi B's second number-one single and second number-one debut on that chart, as well as the first time a female rapper debuts atop the chart with a solo song. "Up" has spent two weeks at number one on that chart. The single opened at number four on the Billboard Global 200, becoming her second top-five debut on the chart. It was Billboards top female rap song and top female R&B/hip-hop song of 2021.

Music video

The official music video directed by Tanu Muino was released to YouTube alongside the song on February 5, 2021. The official lyric video and the first part of the behind-the-scenes video series were released on February 9. Cardi B mainly worked with independent fashion designers and custom-made brands for statement pieces depicted in the music video.

Synopsis
The music video opens with Cardi B wearing a black ensemble as she stands on top of a coffin with a headstone that reads, "RIP 2020." Considered by Harper's Bazaar a reference to Patrick Magaud's book Exhibition in Paris, the graveyard look features Louboutin shoes with back seam stockings, a crystal corset, and a custom black roses hat. Her "fishtail braid" is decorated with cross appliques and black roses. The next scene sees Cardi B in an "angelic" white ball gown with nail gloves and a crystal neckpiece while posing on the hood of a supersized car portraying The Spirit of Ecstasy. For the dance routine, Cardi Bardi wears a custom powder blue velour outfit and spray-painted sneakers, combining elements of Jean Paul Gaultier's 1984 design and vintage sportswear clothing.

Attached to her hair, a number of doll heads speak the line "I know that's right". For the scene where she appears inside a giant clam, the rapper's mermaid-esque bodysuit features a baroque porcelain-finish corset, hip piece, leg pieces, matching handpieces and stripper heels in the same porcelain. The clear look in the champagne scene is a custom transparent plastic aquatic piece, while she sits on a see-through chair held up by a naked guy. For the closing scene, she leads a troupe of dancers and sports a black leather bondage bodysuit and fringe-trimmed arm warmers. In this scene, she wears a "sculptural hairstyle" inspired by Left Eye. In the music video Cardi B has a kiss with two women.

Reception
The video was acclaimed by critics. In Harper's Bazaar, Bianca Betancourt stated that the rapper "raises the bar again" with the "bold" music video, "showing off a number of showstopping, high-fashion looks." Kalleigh Fasanella of Allure wrote about Cardi B's "willingness to experiment with boundary-pushing beauty looks." Mario Abad of Paper commented that the fashion "captured Cardi's provocative style approach and penchant for statement pieces." Eric Torres of Pitchfork stated that "if there's one thing Cardi B will absolutely do, it's turn a music video into a playground for orgiastic visuals dripping in high fashion" adding that "Cardi keeps the high-femme, playful imagery at an all-time high." Torres considered the rapper in a transparent bodysuit sitting in a chair held up by a naked man the best visual, deeming it "a consummate snapshot of Cardi: so confidently in control that it looks like an honor just to be her furniture."

TikTok
The dance routine in the music video, choreographed by Sean Bankhead, inspired a dance challenge on the video-sharing app TikTok, with users performing the moves. Posts by other celebrities and courier employees received media coverage. The dance routine was performed by Leslie Jones during a sketch for the 2021 MTV Movie & TV Awards.

Awards

Live performances
Cardi B performed "Up" and "WAP" for the first time at the 63rd Annual Grammy Awards, airing on CBS on March 14, 2021. She appeared in a metallic armor ensemble while sporting a light purple pixie hairstyle. For the number, vibrant graphics appeared about the stage.

In other media
"Up" was played in the TV series Abbott Elementary during the episode "Step Class", where characters danced to the song. The song was also played and referenced in the 2022 film A Madea Homecoming. The song also served as the theme song of SummerSlam (2021).

Credits and personnel
Credits adapted from Tidal.

 Cardi B – vocals, songwriting
 Yung Dza – production, songwriting
 Sean Island – production, songwriting
 DJ SwanQo – production, songwriting
 Joshua Baker – songwriting
 Jordan Thorpe – songwriting
 Evan LaRay – engineering
 Colin Leonard – mastering
 Leslie Brathwaite – mixing

Charts

Weekly charts

Year-end charts

Certifications

Release history

See also
List of Billboard Hot 100 number ones of 2021

References

External links
 
 
 

2021 singles
2021 songs
Atlantic Records singles
Billboard Hot 100 number-one singles
Cardi B songs
Songs written by Cardi B
Songs written by Pardison Fontaine
Number-one singles in Belgium
Music videos directed by Tanu Muino
American pop songs